Sarahmée Ouellet (born 1988), mononymously known as Sarahmée, is a Senegalese-Canadian rapper from Quebec. She is most noted for her single  "T'as pas cru", which was shortlisted for the 2019 SOCAN Songwriting Prize.

The sister of singer-songwriter Karim Ouellet, she released the EPs Retox in 2011 and Sans détour in 2013 before releasing her full-length debut album Légitime in 2015. She followed up with Irréversible in 2019, and received a Prix Félix nomination for Revelation of the Year at the Gala de l'ADISQ in 2019. The video for her single "Bun Dem", directed by Caraz, was also a Juno Award nominee for Video of the Year at the Juno Awards of 2020.

References

External links
 

21st-century Canadian rappers
Canadian women rappers
Black Canadian musicians
Senegalese emigrants to Canada
Musicians from Quebec
Living people
1988 births
21st-century women rappers